Paula L. Boland (born January 17, 1940) is an American politician from California and a member of the Republican party.

State Assembly

A realtor, Boland won election to the Granada Hills-based 38th district in the California State Assembly in 1990, succeeding Republican Marion W. La Follette.  She easily won reelection in 1992 and 1994.

San Fernando Valley Secession Movement

Boland became associated with an effort by the San Fernando Valley to secede from the rest of city of Los Angeles in 1995. Although she successfully authored the bill to put the referendum on the ballot, it was eventually defeated in a citywide vote.

State Senate Race

In 1996 Boland moved into the Burbank-Glendale-Pasadena-based 21st district in an attempt to succeed veteran Republican Newton Russell in the California State Senate.  Russell was barred by state term limits from seeking reelection.  Boland was hampered by her relocation into the area and a philosophy that seemed a bit too conservative for the district.  She lost to Democrat Adam Schiff, a former Federal prosecutor, by 8 percentage points.

Post Assembly

After leaving the legislature, Boland served as an elected member of the Los Angeles Charter Commission, representing her Granada Hills base.

References

External links
JoinCalifornia

Living people
People from Granada Hills, Los Angeles
Republican Party members of the California State Assembly
Women state legislators in California
1940 births
People from Oyster Bay (town), New York
21st-century American women